The  is a small private museum in Tokyo, Japan, specializing in artifacts of the ancient Near East and Central Asia. It has a collection of Greco-Buddhist art of Gandhara, and several works of art pertaining to the art of Palmyra and Persia.

Location
The Museum is located in the Sunshine City complex in Ikebukuro, at the 7th floor of the Cultural Center (文化会館), and the entrance fee is 900 yen.

Collections

See also

 List of museums in Tokyo

References

External links
Ancient Orient Museum (English)

Ikebukuro
Art museums and galleries in Tokyo